Patea is the third-largest town in South Taranaki District, New Zealand. Hāwera is 27 km to the north-west, and Waverley 17 km to the east. The Pātea River flows through the town from the north-east and into the South Taranaki Bight.

History and culture

Pre-European history

Patea is the traditional final place where some Māori led by Turi aboard the Aotea  settled, after it was beached at the Aotea Harbour.

European settlement
Patea, called Carlyle or Carlyle Beach for a time by European settlers, was originally nearer the Pātea River mouth than the present town. During the New Zealand Wars Patea was an important military settlement. General Cameron's force arrived at the river mouth on 15 January 1865 and constructed redoubts on both sides of the river.

Patea became a market town when hostilities ended. The first of the sections on the present town site were sold in 1870. A local shipping company was established in 1872, and harbour improvements began. The Marton-New Plymouth railway line via Patea was completed in March 1885. The Carlyle Town Board, created about 1877 to administer town affairs, was succeeded by a borough council constituted on 13 October 1881 under the name Patea.

In the 1920s Patea was the largest cheese exporting port in the world. The Grader Cool Store received cheese for grading from all over South Taranaki and as far south as Oroua Downs near Himatangi. After grading it was loaded into coastal ships at the grader wharf for transport to Wellington where it was transhipped into overseas ships for export. The port closed in July 1959.

Patea Freezing Works

In the early 1880s the predecessor to the Patea Freezing Works was established on the eastern bank of the Pātea River. Cool stores for handling dairy produce followed in 1901 with later additions evolving into what became known as the Patea Freezing Co-Op, South Taranaki's primary employer. Strategic reforms, inefficiencies and nationwide over-processing resulted in closure in September 1982. In February 2008 the derelict buildings suffered severe fires. The damage was extensive and with the health hazard presented by asbestos insulation throughout the freezer walls, the town sought demolition.

Patea Māori Club

Patea became known in 1984 as the home of singer Dalvanius Prime and the Pātea Māori Club. Their single, "Poi E", indicated renewed impetus in contemporary Māori popular music.

Recent history

Patea has retained a strong community focus and enjoys many services including a well-resourced medical centre, public swimming pool and trust-owned rest home. The town is also the location of Aotea Utanganui - Museum of South Taranaki.

The breakwaters at Patea were started in 1878 and are being refurbished by the South Taranaki District Council.

Patea and surrounding community has a South Taranaki District Council LibraryPlus, which provides a full library service and Council-related services, including dog registration, payment of rates, and building permit enquiries. Other services include a Tot Time for the under 5s, a regular crossword morning and a book club for intermediate and high school children. The LibraryPlus has six APN computers, offering free internet and Skype.

Several kilometres east of Patea is the small community of Whenuakura, where New Zealand golfer Michael Campbell lived as a child. He learned to play golf at the Patea Golf Club, on the cliffs overlooking the Tasman Sea. He crowned his professional career by winning the U.S. Open in June 2005, and three months later the HSBC World Match Play Championship.

Marae
The local Wai o Turi marae and Rangiharuru meeting house are affiliated with the Ngā Rauru hapū of Rangitāwhi.

In October 2020, the Government committed $298,680 from the Provincial Growth Fund to reconstruct the accessway to the marae and expand the carpark, creating 8 jobs.

Demographics

There were 525 households. There were 609 males and 582 females, giving a sex ratio of 1.05 males per female. The median age was 46.7 years (compared with 37.4 years nationally), with 219 people (18.4%) aged under 15 years, 180 (15.1%) aged 15 to 29, 522 (43.8%) aged 30 to 64, and 270 (22.7%) aged 65 or older.

Ethnicities were 60.5% European/Pākehā, 49.1% Māori, 5.3% Pacific peoples, 2.5% Asian, and 0.5% other ethnicities (totals add to more than 100% since people could identify with multiple ethnicities).

The proportion of people born overseas was 7.8%, compared with 27.1% nationally.

Although some people objected to giving their religion, 46.3% had no religion, 34.5% were Christian, 0.8% were Hindu, 0.8% were Buddhist and 6.8% had other religions.

Of those at least 15 years old, 69 (7.1%) people had a bachelor or higher degree, and 345 (35.5%) people had no formal qualifications. The median income was $19,500, compared with $31,800 nationally. The employment status of those at least 15 was that 306 (31.5%) people were employed full-time, 129 (13.3%) were part-time, and 69 (7.1%) were unemployed.

Education
Until 2005 the school was Patea High School. It became an area school when Patea Primary School closed. The primary school was founded in 1875.

The school was established in January 1904.

Both schools are coeducational. Rolls are as of

Notable people
 Vera Burt (1927—2017), international cricketer and field hockey player
 Eric D'Ath (1897—1979), professor of pathology and medical jurisprudence at the University of Otago
 Len Keys (1880—1958), lawn bowls player who competed for his country at the 1934 British Empire Games, businessman, one of the pioneers of the Auckland passenger bus service
 Cedric Muir (1912—1975), cricketer, played in one first-class match for Wellington in 1943/44
 Denise Newlove (1973—present), Scottish international cricketer
 Debbie Ngarewa-Packer (1966/1967—present), Member of Parliament, co-leader of the Māori Party
 Dalvanius Prime (1948—2002), entertainer and songwriter, recorded Poi E with the Pātea Māori Club
 Codey Rei (1989—present), rugby union player
 Alistair Scown (1948—present), rugby union player
 Murray Watts (1955—present), rugby union player
 Cecil J. Wray (1867–1955), sports administrator, represented New Zealand on the International Olympic Committee from 1931 to 1934, and was on the Rugby Football Union in England for 25 years.

References

External links

 South Taranaki District Council

Populated places in Taranaki
South Taranaki District